Deidre Willmott is a former Chief Executive Officer of the Chamber of Commerce and Industry of Western Australia. Prior to becoming Executive Chairman of Cannings Purple Strategic, Wilmott was Communications Director of External Relations for the Fortescue Metals Group.

Early life
She was born in Bridgetown, Western Australia, and studied law at the University of Western Australia.

Career
As a student, Willmott elected was President of the University of Western Australia Student Guild, the second female since its founding in 1913.

Willmott was admitted as a legal practitioner in 1986.
After working as a commercial lawyer she was General Manager of the 2006 Commonwealth Games between 2003 and 2006. Willmott was the executive director of the Western Australian Chamber of Commerce and Industry between 2006 and 2008.

She was the Cabinet Secretary and Chief of Staff for two Western Australian premiers, Richard Court and Colin Barnett between 2008 and 2010. In 2008, she withdrew as the Liberal candidate for Cottesloe in the 2008 state election, after Barnett decided to rescind his earlier resignation. Following that, she initially accepted an offer by Liberal Party figures to succeed retiring Senator Chris Ellison, but that position was eventually filled by Chris Back.

Willmott was the initial Commonwealth Heads of Government Meeting state director 2011 for Perth.

Personal life
She married a fellow UWA student Michael Lishman. She is the deputy chairman of St Hilda's Anglican School and board member of the Senses Foundation.

References

See also
 Andrew Forrest

Living people
People from Bridgetown, Western Australia
20th-century Australian lawyers
University of Western Australia alumni
Fortescue Metals Group
Australian public servants
Australian women lawyers
Year of birth missing (living people)